Stenocercus boettgeri, Boettger's whorltail iguana, is a species of lizard of the Tropiduridae family.  It is found in Peru.

References

Stenocercus
Reptiles described in 1911
Endemic fauna of Peru
Reptiles of Peru
Taxa named by George Albert Boulenger